Ramiro de León Carpio (12 January 1942 – 16 April 2002) was the President of Guatemala from 6 June 1993 until 14 January 1996.

Career
De León studied law at the University of San Carlos and then at the Rafael Landívar University, where he ran the Sol Bolivariano ("Bolivarian Sun") newspaper. After graduating he became a state civil servant, working in the Common Market division of the Ministry of Economy between 1967 and 1969, when he became the permanent secretary of the tariff committee. In 1970 he became permanent secretary for the National Committee for Economic and Political integration. During this time he joined the right wing National Liberation Movement (MLN), whose candidate Carlos Arana won the 1970 presidential elections, and during Arana's four-year term de León served as secretary general of the State Advisory Board. He then moved to the private sector, joining the Guatemala Association of Sugar Producers, serving as their legal advisor between 1978 and 1981, and then as their general administrator until 1983. He then became involved in the bloodless coup that saw President Efraín Ríos Montt replaced by Óscar Humberto Mejía.

Along with his cousin Jorge Carpio de Leon co-founded the center-right Unity of the National Center (UCN) party. It opposed authoritarianism, and instead proposed a social liberalism. He became one of the party's 21 deputies in 1984. He played an important role in creating the 1985 Constitution, still in force to this day. He supported his cousin in the latter's attempt to win the presidential elections of 1985. Carpio got to the second round, but was then defeated by Vinicio Cerezo. De León then resigned from the UCN.

In 1989 de Leon became Defensor del Pueblo ("People's Defender"), Guatemala's human rights ombudsman. While this gave him the ability to denounce human rights abuses by the powers-that-be (and be heard when he did it), he did not have any actual power to combat these abuses.

President (1993–1996)
On 25 May 1993, President Jorge Serrano led an autocoup – a coup d'état by someone(s) in the country's own governmentdissolving the constitution and the National Congress, and giving the order to arrest de León. He avoided arrest by escaping over the roofs of the adjacent houses, and was then able to send out a condemnation of the coup. On 1 June, Serrano was forced to flee the country. The army wanted to install the conservative Gustavo Espina, Vice-President under Serrano, as the new President. De León had already accused him of violating the constitution during the autocoup. On 5 June Espina resigned, and after an overwhelming vote of confidence from the National Congress, de León was quickly sworn in as President until 14 January 1996, the day Serrano had been due to finish his term.

De León promised to defend public freedoms and the rule of law, as well as make progress in the negotiations with the guerrillas, and purge the armed forces of their bad apples. He fired the defence minister General José Domingo García Samayoa, replacing him with General Jorge Roberto Perussina Rivera, who had been implicated in the massacres of the 1980s. On 3 July, his cousin Jorge Carpio, who was playing a vital role in the peace negotiations, was assassinated by right-wingers. On 26 August, he demanded that both all the deputies in the National Congress and all the members of the Supreme Court of Justice resign. This created a crisis that was not resolved until 16 November resulting in 43 amendments to the 1985 constitution, which were approved in a referendum on 30 January 1994.
On 6 January, negotiations began with the main guerrilla group, the URNG, but this time under the auspices of both the United Nations and the Organization of American States (OAS), and with a reduced role of the Guatemalan military in comparison with the previous negotiations. On 29 March, he signed the Global Accord on Human Rights, which amongst other things demanded the disbandment of the Autodefence Civil Patrols (PAC), which had been accused of involvement in the massacres occurring during the Civil War.

Both the murder of Supreme Court chief Eduardo Epaminondas González Dubón on 3 April, and a massacre of civilians by soldiers in Xamán, department of Alta Verapaz, on 5 October 1995, created high levels of tension in the country, and put strains on the peace process. Yet in spite of these tensions free elections were able to be held under de León's rule. On 14 August 1994, 80 of the 116 seats in the National Congress came up for election, unusual in Guatemala where the members of Congress normally stand for election to coincide with the presidential election. On 12 November 1995, a new presidential election was held, and in the second round on 7 January 1996, Álvaro Arzú won to replace de León.

Post-presidency
In October 1996, de Leon became a deputy in the Central American Parliament. During the next few years he worked as an international advisor and was an election monitor for the OAS. In 1999 he joined the Guatemalan Republican Front (FRG), and was elected to the Congress in the November elections. Then, on 11 March 2002, he resigned his seat in the Congress and from the FRG, declaring that he wished he had never accepted their leader Efraín Ríos Montt's invitation to join the party. His intention was to write his memoirs and reinvolve himself in international work but he died while visiting Miami, United States, on 16 April; probably from a diabetic coma. National mourning was declared, he was given a state funeral and was posthumously awarded the Grand Collar of the Sovereign National Congress.

References

External links
Biography by CIDOB 

Presidents of Guatemala
Members of the Congress of Guatemala
Ombudspersons in Guatemala
1942 births
2002 deaths
Institutional Republican Party politicians
National Liberation Movement (Guatemala) politicians
Human rights in Guatemala
People from Guatemala City
20th-century Guatemalan people